Holding the Baby is an American sitcom television series that aired on Fox from August 23 until December 15, 1998. The series is an American version of the British show of the same name.

Premise
An ad exec hires a female grad student as a nanny for his newborn son when his wife moves to Tibet with another man.

Cast

Main 
Jon Patrick Walker as Gordon Stiles
Jennifer Westfeldt as Kelly O'Malley
Eddie McClintock as Jimmy Stiles
Ron Leibman as Stan Peterson 
Sherri Shepherd as Miss Boggs
Carter Kemp / Jordan Kemp as Dan

Episodes

References

External links

1998 American television series debuts
1998 American television series endings
1990s American sitcoms
English-language television shows
American television series based on British television series
Fox Broadcasting Company original programming
Television series by 20th Century Fox Television
Television series by ITV Studios
Television shows set in Los Angeles